The 2019 President's Cup was the sixth President's Cup contested for. The match was played between the champions of 2018 League of Ireland Premier Division and 2018 FAI Cup, Dundalk, and Cork City who were runners-up in both of those competitions. It took place on 9 February 2019, at Turners Cross and was won by Dundalk.

Dundalk won the game 2-1 to win their second President's Cup.

Match

Summary
Cork were looking for a fourth consecutive President’s Cup victory. It was the first competitive game for new Dundalk manager Vinny Perth since taking over from Stephen Kenny.	
In the 36th minute Dane Massey put Dundalk ahead with a powerful header from six yards out after a corner form the right. In first-half injury time Patrick Hoban made it 2-0 with a header to the right corner from six yards out after a cross from Michael Duffy on the left.	
Kevin O'Connor pulled one back for Cork in the 65th minute with a free-kick into the top left corner of the net.

Details

See also
 2018 FAI Cup
 2018 League of Ireland Premier Division

References

President of Ireland's Cup
2
President of Ireland's Cup 2019
President of Ireland's Cup 2019
President's Cup